The genus Mephitis is one of several genera of skunks, which has two species and a North American distribution.

Skunks
Mammal genera
Taxa named by Georges Cuvier
Taxa named by Étienne Geoffroy Saint-Hilaire

eo:Mefito
ru:Скунс